Elongin A is a protein that in humans is encoded by the ELOA gene.

Elongin A is a subunit of the transcription factor B (SIII) complex. The SIII complex is composed of elongins A/A2, B and C. It activates elongation by RNA polymerase II by suppressing transient pausing of the polymerase at many sites within transcription units. Elongin A functions as the transcriptionally active component of the SIII complex, whereas elongins B and C are regulatory subunits. Elongin A2 is specifically expressed in the testis and is capable of forming a stable complex with elongins B and C. The von Hippel–Lindau tumor suppressor protein binds to elongins B and C and thereby inhibits transcription elongation.

References

Further reading